Horace Wells (January 21, 1815 – January 24, 1848) was an American dentist who pioneered the use of anesthesia in dentistry, specifically the use of nitrous oxide (or laughing gas).

Early life

Wells was the first of three children of Horace and Betsy Heath Wells, born on January 21, 1815, in Hartford, Vermont. His parents were well-educated and affluent land owners, which allowed him to attend private schools in New Hampshire and Amherst, Massachusetts. At the age of 19 in 1834, Wells began studying dentistry under a two-year apprenticeship in Boston. The first dental school did not open until 1840 in Baltimore.

At age 23, Wells published a booklet "An Essay on Teeth" in which he advocated for his ideas in preventive dentistry, particularly for the use of a toothbrush. In his booklet, he also described tooth development and oral diseases, where he mentioned diet, infection, and oral hygiene as important factors.

After obtaining a degree, Wells set up a practice in Hartford, Connecticut, with an associate named William T. G. Morton, who would become famous for his use of ether as an anesthetic on October 16, 1846.

Career

After he completed dental training in Boston, Wells opened his own office in Hartford, Connecticut on April 4, 1836. Between 1841 and 1845, Wells became a reputable dentist in Hartford, where he had many patients and attracted apprentices. Among his patients were respected members of society such as William Ellsworth, the governor of Connecticut. His three apprentices were John Riggs, C. A. Kingsbury, and William Morton. In 1843, Wells and Morton started a practice in Boston and Wells continued to instruct Morton. John Riggs later became a partner and Kingsbury became one of the founders of Philadelphia Dental College.

Wells first witnessed the effects of nitrous oxide on December 10, 1844, when he and his wife Elizabeth attended a demonstration by Gardner Quincy Colton billed in the Hartford Courant as "A Grand Exhibition of the Effects Produced by Inhaling Nitrous Oxide, Exhilarating, or Laughing Gas." The demonstration took place at Union Hall, Hartford. During the demonstration, a local apothecary shop clerk Samuel A. Cooley became intoxicated by nitrous oxide. While under the influence, Cooley did not react when he struck his legs against a wooden bench while jumping around. After the demonstration, Cooley was unable to recall his actions while under the influence, but found abrasions and bruises on his knees. From this demonstration, Wells realized the potential for the analgesic properties of nitrous oxide, and met with Colton about conducting trials.

The following day, Wells conducted a trial on himself by inhaling nitrous oxide and having John Riggs extract a tooth. Upon a successful trial where he did not feel any pain, Wells went on to use nitrous oxide on at least 12 other patients in his office. In 1844, Hartford did not have a hospital, so Wells sought to demonstrate his new findings in either Boston or New York. In January 1845 he chose to go to Boston where he had previously studied dentistry, and also knew William Morton, his former student and associate. Wells and Morton's practice had been dissolved in October 1844, but they remained on friendly terms. Morton was enrolled in Harvard Medical School at the time and agreed to help Wells introduce his ideas, although Morton was skeptical about the use of nitrous oxide.

He gave a demonstration to medical students at the Massachusetts General Hospital in Boston on January 20, 1845. However, the gas was improperly administered and the patient cried out in pain. The patient later admitted that although he cried out in pain, he remembered no pain and did not know when the tooth was extracted. It was later found that the gas is not as effective on both obese people and alcoholics—the patient was both. The audience of students in the surgical theatre jeered "humbug". After the embarrassment of his failed demonstration, Wells immediately returned home to Hartford the next day. Shortly after, he became ill and his dental practice became sporadic.

On February 5, 1845, Wells advertised his home for rent. On April 7, 1845, Wells advertised in the Hartford Courant that he was going to dissolve his dental practice, and referred all his patients to Riggs, the man who had extracted his tooth.

In October 1846, Morton gave a successful demonstration of ether anesthesia in Boston. Following Morton's demonstration, Wells published a letter accounting his successful trials in 1844 in an attempt to claim the discovery of anesthesia. His efforts in establishing his claim were mostly unsuccessful.

Despite his advertisement for dissolving his practice in April 1845, Wells sporadically continued his practice, with his last daybook entry being on November 5, 1845.

Later years
Wells closed his office nine times and relocated six different times between 1836 and 1847. He closed his office due to ill health, although his physician could not find any physical cause for his non-specific complaints. He mentioned his recurring illness in a letter to his sister Mary Wells Cole in April 1837. He also became ill shortly after marrying Elizabeth Wales in 1838 and having his only son Charles Thomas Wells. During winter months, he would not write letters to any family or friends, except for his published letter in 1846 after Morton's ether demonstration.

Wells definitively ended his dental practice in late 1845 and began selling shower baths for which he received a patent on November 4, 1846. He also planned to sail to Paris to purchase paintings to resell in the United States. He traveled to Paris in early 1847, where he petitioned the Academie Royale de Medicine and the Parisian Medical Society for recognition in the discovery of anesthesia.

Wells moved to New York City in January 1848, leaving his wife and young son behind in Hartford. He lived alone at 120 Chambers St in Lower Manhattan and began self-experimenting with ether and chloroform, and he became addicted to chloroform. The effects of sniffing chloroform and ether were unknown.

Wells rushed into the street on January 21, 1848, his 33rd birthday, and threw sulfuric acid over the clothing of two prostitutes. He was committed to New York's infamous Tombs Prison. As the influence of the drug waned, his mind started to clear and he realised what he had done. He asked the guards to escort him to his house to pick up his shaving kit. He committed suicide in his cell on January 24, slitting his left femoral artery with a razor after inhaling an analgesic dose of chloroform. He is buried at Cedar Hill Cemetery in Hartford, Connecticut.

Legacy
Twelve days before his death, the Parisian Medical Society voted and honored him as the first to discover and perform surgical operations without pain. In addition, he was elected an honorary member and awarded an honorary MD degree. However, Wells died unaware of these decisions. Wells first voiced his concern for minimizing his patient's pain during dental procedures in 1841. He was known for caring about his patient's comfort. During his time as a dentist, Wells advocated for regular check ups for dental hygiene, and also began the practice of pediatric dentistry in order to start dental care early.

The American Dental Association honored Wells posthumously in 1864 as the discoverer of modern anesthesia, and the American Medical Association recognized his achievement in 1870.

A monument to Horace Wells was raised in the Place des États-Unis, Paris.

Hartford, Connecticut, has a statue of Horace Wells in Bushnell Park.

In popular culture
 The story of Dr. Wells' self-experimentation with drugs was explored in an episode of Science Channel's Dark Matters: Twisted But True in a story entitled "Jekyll vs Hyde", comparing it to the Strange Case of Dr Jekyll and Mr Hyde.
 A full-length theatrical production, entitled Ether Dome, written by Elizabeth Egloff and directed by Michael Wilson centers around the story of Horace Wells' discovery of nitrous oxide as an anesthetic, as well as the life of his protege and partner, William Morton.

See also
 Dental anesthesiology
 Humphry Davy
 Crawford Long
 James Young Simpson
 Place des États-Unis

Gallery

References

Further reading
 
Musto, David F., "They Inhaled", New York Times, August 12, 2001 (review of Ether Day)

External links
 Dr Horace Wells (1815–1848) Accessed: 2008-06-17

 Vermont History – Horace Wells
 Herald (Scotland)
 

1815 births
1848 deaths
American anesthesiologists
American dentists
Burials at Cedar Hill Cemetery (Hartford, Connecticut)
People from Hartford, Connecticut
People from Hartford, Vermont
Suicides by sharp instrument in the United States
Suicides in New York City
1840s suicides
19th-century dentists